Soran Emirate was a medieval Kurdish emirate established before the conquest of Kurdistan by Ottoman Empire in 1514 and later revived by Emir Kor centered in Rawandiz from 1816 to 1836. Kor was ousted in an offensive by the Ottomans.

Early years
While no date has been established for the origin of the Soran Emirate, Kurdish historian Sharafkhan Bidlisi mentions the Emirate in Sharafnama in 1597 as established by a shepherd by the name of Isa. Bitlisi claims that villagers quickly followed the popular Isa and they attacked the Rewan Castle where they established themselves. They took the name Soran meaning from red after the red stones near the castle. Qadir Muhammad Muhammad writes that the emirate was likely established sometime between the 1330s and 1430s. 

Years later, during the Battle of Chaldiran in 1514 between the Ottomans and the Safavids, the Emirate was able to conquer land between Erbil and Kirkuk. In 1534, Emir Ezaddin Sher was executed by Suleiman the Magnificent for his treatment of the Emperor's servants and the Emirate was given to Yazidis led by Hussein Beg who ruled as a brutal tyrant. He was soon toppled by the family of the previous Emir led by Emir Saifaddin who himself was executed by the Emperor in Constantinople, pushing the Emirate into anarchy.

Under Emir Kor
The last prince of the emirate was Emir Muhammad Kor, who reigned from 1813 to 1836. His father, Mustafa Beg, peacefully handed the princedom to him. In the first few years of his rule, he was able to consolidate his power and began launching attacks towards the neighboring principality of Baban.  He defeated the Baban at the battle of Harir in 1822, battle of Koysinjaq, battle of Altunkupri, and battle of Erbil in 1823, and  battle of Akre and battle of Raniyah in 1824. This established the Zab river as the border between the two emirates.

As the region experienced a power vacuum due to the decline of Baban, the Russo-Turkish War from 1828 to 1829, and the Egyptian–Ottoman War from 1831 to 1833, he led a tribal force to Rawandiz and built a citadel in the town as they build up a military. Between 1831 and 1834 he was able to capture several towns and cities in other Kurdish emirates. 1831 he captured the Bahdinan emirate of Amedi. Kor further expanded his influence to Mardin, Cizre and Nusaybin, compelling the ruler of the Bohtan Mir Sevdin, to accept his authority, which caused serious concern in the Ottoman capital Constantinople. Kor then captured Akre and oppressed Yazidis in the newly-conquered areas.

Under Emir Kor, the Soran emirate developed a powerful army. It consisted of between 30 to 50,000 tribal musketeers who were given regular salaries, having the appearance of a national army. Kor himself ate each evening with 100-200 soldiers from different tribes. A multitude of different tribes joined his army such as the Baliki, Rewendek, Sidek, Shirwani, Rusuri, Malibas, Sheikhab, Nurik, Kheilani, Hnearai, Sheikh Mahmudi, Kassan, Derijiki, Bamami, Sekw, Shikuli, Mendik, Baimar, and Piraji. 

Fearing a cooperation between the Soran Emirate and Muhammad Ali of Egypt, the Ottomans dispatched an army to Soran in 1834. Mire Kor was able to repeal the forces and push towards Iran. This led Kurdish notables from Bradost, Akre and Amedi to complain to Reşid Mehmed Pasha of the Ottoman government alleging they were oppressed by Mir Kor of Soran.

Kor tried to subdue the Assyrians of Tyari in 1834 but suffered a humiliating defeat near the village of Lezan in Lower Tyari. This defeat played a major role in the downfall of the emirate. A second Ottoman offensive was initiated in 1836 which forced Kor to retreat to Rawandiz, mainly due to the lack of support from his tribal allies.

After having pressured to surrender by the situation given, Emir Kor travelled to Istanbul for negotiations, where he was given authority over the area of the Emirate of Soran. But on his way home he disappeared in the Black Sea area and the Ottoman Empire supported his brother Rasul as the Emir of the Emirate. The Emirate would ultimately fall victim to the growing centralization of the Ottoman Empire.

Kurdish awareness
There were traits of Kurdish awareness by the Soran Emirate including the desire to unite all Kurdish areas under one rule and the use of Kurdish uniforms for his army. On this, Emir  Kor's brother Rasul told British writer and traveller Frederick Milingen:

Moreover, researcher Ghalib writes:

See also
List of Kurdish dynasties and countries
 Mir Xanzad

Notes

Bibliography

16th-century establishments in Asia
1816 establishments in Asia
1836 disestablishments in Asia
Former Kurdish states in Iraq
Kurdish dynasties
Former emirates
History of the Kurdish people
Yazidis in Iraq